Bradley Beach is a railway station located at Railroad Square between Brinley and Lareine Avenues in Bradley Beach of Monmouth County, New Jersey. It is served by trains on NJ Transit's North Jersey Coast Line.

History 
The current station depot was built in 1912 by Joseph Osgood for the Central Railroad of New Jersey, and has been on the state and federal registers of historic places since 1984, listed as part of the Operating Passenger Railroad Stations Thematic Resource.

Station layout
The station has two low-level asphalt side platforms.

See also
List of New Jersey Transit stations
National Register of Historic Places listings in Monmouth County, New Jersey
North Jersey Coast Line
Bradley Beach, New Jersey

References

External links

 Station from Google Maps Street View

Railway stations in Monmouth County, New Jersey
NJ Transit Rail Operations stations
Railway stations in the United States opened in 1893
Railway stations on the National Register of Historic Places in New Jersey
Stations on the North Jersey Coast Line
National Register of Historic Places in Monmouth County, New Jersey
Bradley Beach, New Jersey
1893 establishments in New Jersey
New Jersey Register of Historic Places
Former New York and Long Branch Railroad stations